The Metro Manila Subway, formerly known as the Mega Manila Subway (MMS), is an under-construction underground rapid transit line in Metro Manila, Philippines. It will become the country's second direct airport rail link after the North–South Commuter Railway, with a branch line to Ninoy Aquino International Airport.

Dubbed as the "Project of the Century" in the country, the subway line's groundbreaking took place on February 27, 2019, and construction began the following December. Construction however suffered delays due to the COVID-19 pandemic. It is scheduled to be partially opened in 2025, and will be fully operational by 2028. The project is expected to cost ₱355.6billion (equivalent to US$ in 2017 dollars). Much of its cost is covered by a loan provided by the Japan International Cooperation Agency (JICA).

The line is integrated with the public transit system in Metro Manila, and passengers also take various forms of road-based public transport, such as buses and jeepneys, to and from a station to reach their intended destination. The line is also designed to connect with other urban rail transit services in the region. Riders may transfer to LRT Line 1, MRT Line 3, and MRT Line 7 at the nearby North Triangle Common Station, which is also currently under construction. Other connections include the existing LRT Line 2 and PNR Metro Commuter Line, as well as the planned Makati Intra-city Subway, the MRT Line 4, and MRT Line 8.

Proposed route
The project involves the construction of 17 stations in its first phase (listed from north to south):

The following phases of the subway project would involve extending lines up to San Jose del Monte, Bulacan, north of Metro Manila ( from the proposed Mindanao Avenue station), and down to Dasmariñas, Cavite, south of Metro Manila ( from the proposed Ninoy Aquino International Airport station). The entire system, when completed, will serve up to 1.74 million passengers daily.

The initial plan was later modified in June 2020, with DOTr adding the East Valenzuela, Lawton, and Senate stations. The East Valenzuela station will be located in the subway's depot, while the Lawton and Senate stations replaced the Cayetano Boulevard station. However, these modifications are subject to the approval of NEDA and JICA.

DOTr and JICA also propose a physical connection and interoperability between the North–South Commuter Railway and MMS. It proposes MMS rolling stock to switch over to the at-grade NSCR-South tracks around the  area, via a physical connection of the tracks and electrical supply, and operate through services to NSCR-South stations from  towards  and vice versa.

History

Background
The idea of building a subway in the Greater Manila Area had been forwarded as early as 1973, when the JICA (at the time known as the Overseas Technical Cooperation Agency or OTCA) and former Secretary of Public Works and Highways David Consunji conducted a study on what shall later be Metro Manila (formally constituted on November 7, 1975). The 1973 plan was known as the Urban Transport Study in Manila Metropolitan Area (UTSMMA). It was also proposed to be part of the 1977 Metro Manila Transport, Land Use and Development Planning Project (MMETROPLAN), which was funded by the World Bank. However, the plan was not included and implemented, for some of the areas included in the plan, such as Marikina and Cainta, are prone to flooding. Instead, what was built was the Manila Light Rail Transit System Line 1, opened on December 1, 1984 and completed on May 12, 1985. According to Felino Palafox, the LRT was the most feasible transport system at that time. Nevertheless, the current Manila Light Rail Transit System (mostly elevated) is shorter than the line system forwarded in 1973.

The 1973 plan provided for the construction of five heavy rail subway lines in Metro Manila. The plan would have resolved the traffic problems of Metro Manila and would have taken 15 years to complete, or until 1988.

The project was proposed once more in the 2014 Metro Manila Dream Plan as a  line that would serve as the second north–south mass transit backbone for the newly expanded Greater Capital Region (the first being the North–South Commuter Railway). The Metro Manila Dream Plan (formally titled the Roadmap for Transport Infrastructure Development for Metro Manila and Its Surrounding Areas) is an integrated plan, created on the basis of recommendations from a study conducted by the Japan International Cooperation Agency (JICA). It was approved by the National Economic and Development Authority (NEDA) Board in June 2014, to last until 2030. The program aims to improve the transport system in Metro Manila, Philippines, with the hope of turning it into a focal point for addressing Metro Manila's interlinked problems in the areas of transportation, land use, and environment.

Development
The development of the project was approved by the Investment Coordination Committee (ICC) board of the National Economic and Development Authority on September 6, 2017, subject to secondary approval by the NEDA Board. The development was approved by the NEDA Board headed by President Rodrigo Duterte six days later. On March 16, 2018, the Philippine and Japanese governments signed a loan agreement for the subway. The first tranche of the official development assistance from the Japan International Cooperation Agency amounted to ¥104.5 billion. The second tranche of the loan, signed on February 10, 2022, amounted to ¥253.3 billion.

In November 2018, OC Global, a Japanese consortium consisting of Oriental Consultants Global Co. Ltd., Tokyo Metro Co. Ltd., Katahira & Engineers International, Pacific Consultants Co Ltd., Tonichi Engineering Consultants, Inc., and Metro Development Co. Ltd., was awarded the  contract for the consulting services of the line.

The line was originally slated to begin partial operations by 2022, with three stations: the Qurino Highway, the Tandang Sora, and the North Avenue stations, are expected to begin operations within the said year. In June 2018, soil testing was conducted along the alignment. Massive tunnel boring machines will be employed for the project. In line with this, DOTr, PNR and JICA personnel inspected actual tunnel boring machines in Japan, estimated to arrive in May 2019.

Construction

The groundbreaking ceremony of the Metro Manila Subway was held on February 27, 2019. Ten months later, construction begun its clearing phase in Valenzuela on December 21. As part of the partial operability section, the first three stations will be built alongside the Philippine Railways Institute (PRI), the country's first-ever railway training center.

In September 2020, the Department of Transportation (DOTr) presented one of the six tunnel boring machines in an acceptance test ceremony through a video conference. The first of 25 tunnel boring machines that will be used for the subway's construction was unveiled on February 5, 2021.

On November 11, 2021, a groundbreaking ceremony was held at Camp Aguinaldo to mark the start of pre-construction activities at the Camp Aguinaldo station.

In April 2022, the Department of Transportation announced that partial operations of the subway will be delayed to 2025 instead of the originally planned opening in 2022 as a result of delays brought by the COVID-19 pandemic.

The underground and tunnel boring works for the subway were slated to start by the fourth quarter of 2021, but was delayed. The first tunnel boring machine was ceremonially lowered on June 12, 2022, while underground tunnel works began on January 9, 2023.

Construction for the Ortigas and Shaw stations began on October 3, 2022, with the groundbreaking ceremony led by President Bongbong Marcos and Transportation Secretary Jaime Bautista. Work on the Katipunan and Anonas stations began on February 13, 2023.

, Phase 1 of the project is 37.48% complete.

Design and infrastructure
The line will be the fourth heavy rail line in the country, after LRT Line 2, MRT Line 7, and the North–South Commuter Railway, and the first to be mostly underground. Since there are estimates of an expected magnitude-7.2 earthquake (which can be as powerful as magnitude 7.6) in the Marikina Valley Fault System, it is designed to withstand a magnitude-8.0 earthquake. In addition, it may not be entirely underground. Prior to final approval, some adjustments to the alignment were done so that it would reduce the risk of damage during earthquakes by travelling along solid adobe ground.

On September 5, 2020, in response to questions, Transportation Secretary Arthur Tugade provided assurances that the system would be flood-proof, and announced that partial operations would commence in 2022, with the system being fully operational by 2026.

Stations
The stations would have design features such as water-stop panels, a high-level entrance for flood prevention, earthquake detection, and a train stop system, akin to the Tokyo subway. The stations are also designed to accommodate up to 1.5 million passengers daily. Full-height platform screen doors will also be built in the stations.

The major stations of the line are planned to have two platform levels, one for a local train service and another for express routes. These stations are planned to have 6 floors designed for 2 platform floors, commercial shops, ticketing facilities and other amenities.

Signalling
The line will use a moving block signalling system based on communications-based train control (CBTC), which is the first railway line in the Philippines to use a moving block/CBTC system. Its subsystems include automatic train protection (ATP), automatic train operation (ATO), automatic train supervision (ATS), train detection through track circuits, and computer-based interlocking. Nippon Signal will provide their SPARCS CBTC signalling solution for the line.

Tracks
Two types of rails will be employed in the subway:  rails will be employed in the mainline while  rails will be employed in the depot. The rails in the mainline will consist of continuous welded rails while the rails in the depot will be jointed rails with fishplates. The tracks will be supported by concrete sleepers except for the turnouts which will be supported by plastic/fiber-reinforced foam urethane railroad ties.

Rolling stock
The Metro Manila Subway will use Sustina electric multiple units built by the Sumitomo Corporation and Japan Transport Engineering Company (J-TREC). The same type has been ordered by the Philippine National Railways for its North–South Commuter Railway project as the PNR EM10000 class. An order for 240 railcars, arrangeable into thirty 8-car trainsets, has been finalized by the Department of Transportation on December 21, 2020.

Trains will have a capacity of 2,242 passengers, which is more than the normal capacity of the rolling stock of the existing LRT Line 1, LRT Line 2, MRT Line 3, and the PNR Metro Commuter Line. At its base form, it is about twice longer than the 4-car trains of the LRTA 2000 class being used in the LRT Line 2. According to DOTr Undersecretary Timothy John Batan, each 8-car trainset will ease car traffic in Metro Manila equivalent to 1,300 cars, 220 jeepneys, or 60 buses. It will be powered through 1,500 V DC overhead lines similar to those ordered by PNR.

Depot
The line will have an underground depot in Ugong, Valenzuela, within the vicinity of the East Valenzuela station. It occupies  of space and serves as the headquarters for the operations and maintenance of the line. The trains are parked on several sets of tracks, which converge onto the spur route and later on to the main network.

A  building will host the Philippine Railways Institute which will also be built within the depot vicinity. In addition, a  test track and mock-ups of the tunnels, stations, and wayside equipment will be constructed for training purposes.

Notes

References

External links
JICA: The Mega Manila Subway Project

R
Proposed public transportation in the Philippines
Rail transportation in Metro Manila
Transportation in Bulacan
Transportation in Manila
Transportation in Luzon
2025 in rail transport
1500 V DC railway electrification